East Hampton Village District is a historic district in East Hampton, New York.

It was listed on the National Register of Historic Places in 1974. Its boundaries were increased in 1988.

Contributing properties include what is known as the John Howard Payne House (a.k.a.; "Home Sweet Home") and the Thomas Moran House, a National Historic Landmark.

The Pantigo Windmill and the Gardiner mill, two of the east end's New England-style smock windmills, are also included.

Next to the 1926 flagpole on the village green is a large rock with a plaque installed on it, marking the historic district. The Green slopes up to the South End Cemetery, which was the site of the historic Town Church. It was a thatched roofed structure that was demolished. Near its former site is a memorial to Lion Gardiner, whose grave is 30 feet away. Historical markers about the church are located on both James Lane and Pondview Lane. Further along is the town pond. This oval constitutes the original boundaries of the historic district.

It was expanded to include, on the other side of James Lane, Tuthill House, Mulford Farmhouse, Home Sweet Home (associated with writer John Howard Payne), St. Luke's Episcopal Church and Rectory, the replica of the John Lyon Gardiner Mill Cottage, Gardiner Mill, The Rev. Thomas James historical marker- first pastor of the town church, (1661-1692) and the Thomas Moran House. The trees on side of the street by Mulford homestead are all separately marked with a stone with a name/date shield.

References

External links
 
Amagansett Historic Sites and East Hampton Village Historic District (East Hampton Chamber of Commerce)
East Hampton Historical Society

Historic districts on the National Register of Historic Places in New York (state)
Historic districts in Suffolk County, New York
East Hampton (village), New York
National Register of Historic Places in Suffolk County, New York